Asmir Kajević (Serbian Cyrillic: Асмир Kajeвић, born 15 February 1990) is a Montenegrin football midfielder, currently playing for Wuhan Yangtze River in the Chinese Super League. His preferred position is central midfielder, although he can also play as a defensive and left midfielder.

Club career
Born in Rožaje (SR Montenegro, SFR Yugoslavia), he moved to Serbia where he made his debut as senior for BSK Borča during the 2008–09 Serbian First League and helped the club to win the league and be promoted to the 2009–10 Serbian SuperLiga. In his first top league season, he made 21 league appearances with 2 goals, becoming, along his countryman Stefan Savić, one of the most influential players in the club.  These good displays didn't pass unnoticed in Montenegro, and both became regular members of the Montenegrin U19 team.  The following season, 2010-11, followed the tendency with Kajević making further 26 league appearances with 3 goals. On 19 January 2012, Kajević joined the Swiss team FC Zürich, where he played for four years. On 22 December 2015, HNK Rijeka announced that they have signed Kajević. Although he featured prominently in Rijeka's pre-season friendlies in January and February 2016, he missed the entire half-season due to injury. In June 2016, after Rijeka did not extend his contract, Kajević signed for FK Čukarički as free agent.

On 28 April 2022, Kajević joined Chinese Super League club Wuhan Yangtze River.

International career
After playing with the Montenegrin U19 team, he became a regular member of the Montenegro national under-21 football team since 2010.  He was also part of the Montenegrin squad at the 2009 Mediterranean Games.

He made his senior international debut for the Montenegro on 28 May 2018 against Bosnia and has earned a total of 2 caps, scoring no goals. His second and final international appearance was June 2018 friendly match against Slovenia.

Career Statistics
.

Honours
BSK Borča
Serbian First League: 2008–09

References

External sources

 Asmir Kajević Stats at Utakmica.rs

1990 births
Living people
People from Rožaje
Association football midfielders
Montenegrin footballers
Montenegro youth international footballers
Montenegro under-21 international footballers
Montenegro international footballers
FK BSK Borča players
FC Zürich players
HNK Rijeka players
FK Čukarički players
Wuhan F.C. players
Serbian SuperLiga players
Swiss Super League players
Chinese Super League players
Montenegrin expatriate footballers
Expatriate footballers in Serbia
Montenegrin expatriate sportspeople in Serbia
Expatriate footballers in Switzerland
Montenegrin expatriate sportspeople in Switzerland
Expatriate footballers in China
Montenegrin expatriate sportspeople in China